Isamaa is a Christian-democratic and national-conservative political party in Estonia.

It was founded on 4 June 2006 under the name of "Pro Patria and Res Publica Union", by the merger of two conservative parties, Pro Patria Union and Res Publica Party. Up to the 2007 parliamentary elections, the party held 32 seats out of 101 in the Riigikogu and one of Estonia's six seats in the European Parliament. The party is a member of the European People's Party (EPP). The merged party consisted of two separate boards and two party leaders, which was replaced by a unified board and leader in May 2007. The party's prime minister candidate was Mart Laar, who became a chairman of the party. In 2018, its name was changed to "Isamaa", meaning literally "Fatherland".

Ideologically, it has been positioned on the centre-right or right-wing on the political spectrum, and it is economically liberal.

History

Pre-foundation 
Prior to the merger, there was an extreme drop in public support for Res Publica after the government led by Juhan Parts was forced to step down, and Pro Patria had also been relatively marginalised after the fall of their own governing coalition. There was also concern among conservatives about splitting the vote between two parties with largely similar ideologies and being unable to oppose the much more cohesive left wing electorate, which was mostly rallied behind the Centre Party. On 4 April 2006, representatives from the Pro Patria Union and Res Publica decided to merge the two parties, which took place officially on 4 June 2006. Although originally the name For Estonia (Eesti Eest) was considered for the newly formed party, it was rejected, and the provisional name was used until the new name was adopted in 2018.

On 15 November 2006 the parties were officially merged as Pro Patria and Res Publica Union (Erakond Isamaa ja Res Publica Liit).

2007–2015 
In 2007 Estonian parliamentary election the party won over 18 per cent of the vote and joined coalition, led by their former junior coalition partners, the Reform Party. This cooperation was retained up until 2014, when the Social Democratic Party replaced The Fatherland as junior coalition partner.

2015–2022 
In 2015 parliamentary election, IRL lost 9 seats and managed to keep 14. It joined the Reform Party and Social Democrats to form the government under Taavi Rõivas. As the Pro Patria and Res Publica Union was the biggest loser in the elections, chairman Urmas Reinsalu announced he would resign as party chairman after the party's congress in June 2015. On 6 June 2015, he was replaced by Margus Tsahkna.

On 7 November 2016, the SDE and IRL announced that they were asking Prime Minister Taavi Rõivas to resign and were planning on negotiating a new majority government. In the following coalition talks Center Party, SDE and IRL formed a new coalition led by the Centre Party's chairman, Jüri Ratas. The new coalition was sworn in on 23 November. In April 2017, Tsahkna announced that he would not seek re-election as chairman. He was followed by Helir-Valdor Seeder on 13 May 2017. On 26 June 2017, Tsahkna and MP Marko Mihkelson announced that they were leaving the party, dropping the amount of IRL MPs to 12.

After 2019 parliamentary election, Isamaa joined government with Centre Party and Estonian Conservative People's Party. This government collapsed on January 2021, when Jüri Ratas resigned as Prime Minister.

In 2021, tensions over cooperation with EKRE within the party became public and caused split. Dissenters on August 2022, formed Parempoolsed (Right–wingers).

By July 2022, Centre Party was expelled from the governmental positions. As a result, the government, led by Kaja Kallas, briefly governed in minority. After negotiations with the Social Democratic Party and the Fatherland, a new coalition was formed.

Electoral results

Parliamentary elections

European Parliament elections

Chairmen 
Taavi Veskimägi (Res Publica) and Tõnis Lukas (Pro Patria) (2006–2007)
Mart Laar (2007–2012)
Urmas Reinsalu (2012–2015)
Margus Tsahkna (2015–2017)
Helir-Valdor Seeder (2017–present)

See also 
:Category:Isamaa politicians

References

External links 
Official website

2006 establishments in Estonia
Political parties established in 2006
Christian democratic parties in Europe
International Democrat Union member parties
Conservative parties in Estonia
Member parties of the European People's Party
National conservative parties
Social conservative parties
Political parties in Estonia